Akemi is a unisex Japanese given name.

Possible writings
Akemi can be written using different kanji characters and can mean:

, "bright, beauty"
, "bright, fruit"
, "bright, sea"
, "bright, sign of the snake (Chinese zodiac)"
, "vermilion, beauty"
, "vermilion, not yet"
, "vermilion, fruit"
, "dawn, beauty"
, "daybreak, view"

The name can also be written in hiragana あけみ or katakana アケミ.

Notable people with the name
, Japanese fashion model and television personality
, Japanese voice actress
, Japanese field hockey player
, Japanese marathon runner
, Japanese manga artist
, Japanese marathon runner
, Japanese fencer
, Japanese cyclist
, Japanese actress
, Japanese curler
, Japanese football player
, Japanese voice actress and narrator
, Japanese singer
, Japanese voice actress
, Japanese volleyball player
, male Japanese poet and classical scholar
, Japanese artist and illustrator
, Japanese Nordic combined skier

Fictional characters
, a character in the manga series Vagabond
, a character in the video game Red Ninja: End of Honor
, a character in the manga series Saikano
, a character in the cell phone novel Ōsama Game
, a character in the manga series Case Closed
, protagonist of the novel series Digital Devil Story and its video game adaption, Digital Devil Story: Megami Tensei
Akemi Nakamura, a character in Sister Souljah's books, Midnight: A Gangster Love Story and Midnight and the Meaning of Love
, a character in the manga series Maison Ikkoku
, a character in the manga series Inari, Konkon, Koi Iroha
, a character in the 1966 film The War of the Gargantuas
, a character in the manga series Salaryman Kintarō
, a character in the manga series Tomo-chan Is a Girl!
 Akemi, a character in David Mack's comic book series Kabuki
, a character in the anime series Great Pretender
, a character in the anime series Puella Magi Madoka Magica

References

Japanese feminine given names
Japanese unisex given names